The Giddy Game Show is an animated quiz show for pre-school children, on Children's ITV made by Yorkshire Television from 1985 to 1987.  Scripts were by Marian Lines and Joy Whitby. The first interactive children's television programme.  Using technology developed by Peter Schrek, children had a wand to indicate objects on the screen.

Overview
The programme was set in a scientific observatory inhabited by Giddy, a friendly alien who flew around on a magic pink pencil, setting simple games and puzzles.

Redvers Kyle provided the voice for Giddy, although the little alien sounded very different from the familiar and distinctive sound of Kyle in his regular role as programme announcer for Yorkshire Television.

The other characters that inhabited the observatory were a stupid but lovable gorilla called Gorilla (voiced by Bernard Bresslaw), and a professor called Gus (voiced by Richard Vernon).

Games graphics were by John Sharp and Avram Buchanan.

Transmission guide
Series 1: 26 editions from 19 September 1985 – 27 March 1986
Series 2a: 11 editions from 7 October 1986 – 16 December 1986
Series 2b: 15 editions from 14 April 1987 – 1 September 1987

References

External links

1985 British television series debuts
1987 British television series endings
1980s British children's television series
1980s British game shows
ITV children's television shows
ITV game shows
British children's animated television shows
Television series by ITV Studios
Television series by Yorkshire Television
English-language television shows